"U.N.I.T.Y." is a song by American hip-hop artist Queen Latifah from her third studio album, Black Reign (1993). The single was released on November 9, 1993, in the United States, and on January 6, 1994, in the United Kingdom. "U.N.I.T.Y." focused on confronting disrespect of women in society, addressing issues of street harassment, domestic violence, and slurs against women in hip-hop culture.

Because of its message, many radio and television stations would play the song without censoring the words "bitch" and "hoes", which appear often in the lyrics, particularly the chorus and the line, "who you callin' a bitch?!" that ends each verse of the song.
The song samples "Message from the Inner City" by the Crusaders, a Houston based jazz group. The song was also featured on Living Single, Latifah's series which began the same year.

There is a second version of song, which gained airplay, titled "U.N.I.T.Y. (Queen Ruff Neck Boot)". The second version has a similar beat to the album version, replacing much of the jazz sample with a hip-hop beat. The second version can be found as a clean version on 20th Century Masters: The Millennium Collection: The Best of Queen Latifah and Hip Hop: Gold.

"U.N.I.T.Y." won the 1995 Grammy Award for Best Rap Solo Performance. The song remains Latifah's biggest hit single in the United States to date, and her only song to reach the Top 30 of the Billboard Hot 100.

Music video
The music video was directed by Mark Gerard who also directed Latifah's video for "Just Another Day...". In the video, Latifah rides a motorcycle, in dedication to her brother Lance, who was killed in a motorcycle accident in 1992. The key she catches in the beginning and wears throughout the video is the ignition key to Lance's motorcycle. The video also features a cameo by the rap group Naughty by Nature.

Charts
The single gained commercial success, peaking at no. 23 on the Billboard Hot 100. The single was most successful on the Billboard Hot Rap Singles chart, peaking at no. 2; the single peaked at no. 7 on the Billboard Hot R&B/Hip-Hop Songs chart.

Weekly charts

Year-end charts

Remix
A remix version, known as the "Big Titty Remix", can be found on her "Just Another Day..." single.

In other media
The song is played towards the end of the 1996 film Girls Town and plays during the film's credits. The song's name was used as an episode on Latifah's sitcom, Living Single, and was used as the end credits music for the episode, "U.N.I.T.Y. a.k.a (Five Card Draw)".

References

1993 singles
1993 songs
Queen Latifah songs
Grammy Award for Best Rap Solo Performance
Songs with feminist themes
Songs written by Queen Latifah
Motown singles